Dutch Argentines are Argentine citizens of full or partial Dutch ancestry or people who emigrated from the Netherlands and reside in Argentina. Dutch immigration to Argentina has been one of many migration flows from Europe in that country, although it has not been as numerous as in other cases (they failed to account for 1% of total migration received). However, Argentina received a large contingent of Dutch since 1825. The largest community is in the city of Tres Arroyos in the south of the province of Buenos Aires.

See also  
 Argentina–Netherlands relations
 South African Argentine
 German Argentine

References 

Argentina
Argentina
 
European Argentine